Charles Hoeflinger (September 13, 1832 – September 21, 1880) was a member of the Wisconsin State Assembly.

Biography
Hoeflinger was born on September 13, 1832 in Obermarchtal, Germany. He moved to Fond du Lac, Wisconsin in 1854.

Hoeflinger and his first wife, Antoinette, had five children before her death. Later, he married Antoinette's sister, Anna. They had six children. Hoeflingfer died of stomach cancer on September 21, 1880 and is buried in Wausau, Wisconsin.

Career
Hoeflinger was a member of the Assembly in 1862 and 1870. Additionally, he was Mayor of Wausau, a member of the Wausau City Council and Treasurer of Marathon County, Wisconsin. He was a Democrat.

References

External links

People from Alb-Donau-Kreis
German emigrants to the United States
Politicians from Fond du Lac, Wisconsin
Politicians from Wausau, Wisconsin
Democratic Party members of the Wisconsin State Assembly
Mayors of places in Wisconsin
Wisconsin city council members
1832 births
1880 deaths
Deaths from stomach cancer
19th-century American politicians
Deaths from cancer in Wisconsin